A number of steamships have been named Siberia Maru, including:

, 
, 3,461 GRT

Ship names